Neel Akasher Niche is a 1969 Bangladeshi film starring Razzak and Kabari opposite him. The film was directed by Narayan Ghosh Mita. It also stars Rozi Samad and Anwar Hossain.

Cast 
 Kabari
 Razzak
 Anwar Hossain
 Rozi Samad
 Rabiul Alam
 Hashmot

Music
The film's music was composed by Satya Saha with lyrics written by Gazi Mazharul Anwar and Mohammad Moniruzzaman. Mohammad Ali Siddiqui, Mahmudunnabi and Ferdousi Rahman provided vocals.

References 

1969 films
Bangladeshi drama films
Bengali-language Pakistani films
Films scored by Satya Saha
1960s Bengali-language films
Films directed by Narayan Ghosh Mita